is a private university in Kyoto, Japan.

History 
The university was established in 1965. The founder was Toshima Araki (1897–1978), and Hideo Iwakuro (岩畔 豪雄 Iwakuro Hideo, 10 October 1897 – 22 November 1970), the Japanese spy master who established the Nakano School during World War II.

The university was opened with two faculties: Economics and Science. Later it added faculties and the graduate schools (master's courses in 1969, doctoral courses in 1971).

In 2020, at least 16 students enrolled at the university contracted COVID-19 An official from the Kyoto municipal government described the growing of COVID-19 contractions at the university as "a cluster."

Organization

Undergraduate schools 
 Faculty of Economics
 Faculty of Business Administration
 Faculty of Law
 Faculty of Sociology
 Faculty of International Relations
 Faculty of Foreign Studies
 Faculty of Cultural Studies
 Faculty of Science
 Faculty of information Science and Engineering
 Faculty of Life Sciences

Graduate schools 
 Division of Economics
 Division of Management
 Division of Law
 Division of Sociology
 Division of Foreign Languages
 Division of Science
 Division of Frontier Informatics
 Division of Life Sciences
 Division of Kyoto Studies

Research institutes 
 Institute of Japanese Culture
 Institute for World Affairs
 Institute of Advanced Technology
 Avian Influenza Research Centre
 Institute of Comprehensive Academic Research

Notable faculty 
 Hideo Iwakuro - general
 Haruhiko Kindaichi - linguist
 Toshihide Maskawa - theoretical physicist; recipient of the Nobel Prize in Physics
 Leiji Matsumoto - animator, manga artist
 Kiyoshi Oka -  mathematician

Notable alumni 
 Takao Horiuchi - pop and enka singer
 Yoshiyuki Matsuoka - judoka, Olympic medalist
 Fumiaki Tanaka - rugby player
 Kenjiro Todoroki - Olympic sailor, Olympic medalist
 Toshiki Yui - manga artist

References

External links 
 Official website

Educational institutions established in 1965
Private universities and colleges in Japan
Universities and colleges in Kyoto Prefecture
1965 establishments in Japan
Kansai Collegiate American Football League